Tuček (feminine Tučková) is a Czech surname, it may refer to:

 Jaroslav Tuček, Bohemian fencer
 Petr Tuček (born 1979), Czech ice hockey goaltender
 Sarabeth Tucek, American singer and songwriter
 Tomas Tucek (born 1989), Czech world and European freestyle footbag champion
 Kateřina Tučková (born 1980), Czech novelist and curator

Czech-language surnames